R v Richardson (1758) 97 ER 426 is a foundational UK company law case, which established that companies had an inherent power to remove officials or directors for a reason. Lord Mansfield held, further, that only the members of the company itself (not a court) could determine the validity of the reasons.

Facts
Nine portmen (like aldermen, but town councillors of a port city) of the chartered Corporation of Ipswich claimed in a writ of scire facias that they had been ejected wrongfully and therefore that the contemporary portman was an impostor. It was alleged that they had wilfully failed to attend "four occasional great Courts". These were yearly public meeting events at the "Moot Hall" to conduct the borough's business. It was alleged by the town's bailiffs that the portmen should have attended every meeting. There was a hearing where the portmen gave reasons for not attending. However the bailiffs did not accept them, and the portmen were dismissed. After the nine portmen had been dismissed, an election meeting was held, and a bailiff, Thomas Richardson was chosen. The dismissed portmen alleged this was unlawful, because their dismissals were improper and so there was no vacancy. They argued the dismissals were improper both because it was "not a removal by the whole body, at a corporate assembly: but by a particular Court", and also because the cause was not enough to justify removal by those bailiffs.

Judgment
Lord Mansfield held that the portmen had been improperly dismissed, and so Richardson was not appointed as a new portman. The allegation was that the portmen had failed to attend meetings, a breach of a public duty. However, this could not in itself be a good reason for dismissal from office. Only the corporation as a whole could determine such a matter.

See also

UK company law
United States corporate law
List of cases involving Lord Mansfield

Notes

References

United Kingdom company case law
1758 in British law
Lord Mansfield cases
Court of King's Bench (England) cases